The Muddenahalli-Sathya Sai Loka Seva School is in the village of Muddenahalli, the birthplace of legendary Indian engineer, Sri Mokshagundam Visvesvarayya in chikkaballapura District of Karnataka State, India. The school is run by the Sri Sathya Sai Loka Seva Trust.

The school follows the State syllabus from 6th standard to 10th standard in English and Kannada, as well as CBSE syllabus from 6th standard to 10th standard and PUC in arts, commerce and science. The school offers online-based Advanced Placement and International Baccalaureate options for gifted students.

The Sathya Sai Baba University and Medical College is being constructed.

The school was created by Late Sri Madiyal Narayana Bhat. Sri B Narayana Rao is the honorary secretary of the institution.

References

Boarding schools in Karnataka
Schools in Kolar district